Peter Guarasci (born 25 February 1974) is a Canadian former professional basketball player.  Having played in Serie A and the Basketball Bundesliga, he currently plays in the Lega2 in Italy and is a former prominent member of the Canadian national men's basketball team.

Guarasci played collegiately for Fairfield University for two seasons, 1992–93 and 1993–94.  He was named to the Metro Atlantic Athletic Conference all-rookie team as a freshman.  Guarasci then transferred to Simon Fraser University where he played in 1995 and 1996 and was named 1996 NAIA conference player of the year.  He graduated with a degree in business.

The 6'9, 230 lbs. Guarasci joined Italian club Scavolini Pesaro in 1996 and played three seasons for the club.  He played 1999-2000 for the German club Frankfurt Skyliners, averaging 10.5 points per game.  He returned to Serie A the next season joining Roseto Basket, where he stayed for three seasons.  In 2003, he joined his current club Basket Rimini Crabs.

Guarasci was a member of the Canadian national team from 1996 through 2003, participating in the 1998 FIBA World Championship and 2000 Summer Olympics.  The Canadians were impressive early on at these Olympics, winning their group in the preliminary round, before being defeated by France in the quarter-finals.

Of Italian descent, Guarasci has acquired dual Canadian-Italian citizenship.

Sources

www.canoe.ca
Wikipedia in Italian

1974 births
Living people
1998 FIBA World Championship players
Basket Rimini Crabs players
Basketball people from Ontario
Basketball players at the 2000 Summer Olympics
Basketball players at the 2003 Pan American Games
Canadian expatriate basketball people in Germany
Canadian expatriate basketball people in Italy
Canadian expatriate basketball people in the United States
Canadian men's basketball players
Canadian people of Italian descent
Citizens of Italy through descent
Fairfield Stags men's basketball players
Liga ACB players
Olympic basketball players of Canada
Pallacanestro Reggiana players
Pan American Games competitors for Canada
Real Betis Baloncesto players
Roseto Sharks players
Simon Fraser Clan men's basketball players
Skyliners Frankfurt players
Sportspeople from Niagara Falls, Ontario
Universiade medalists in basketball
Universiade bronze medalists for Canada
Victoria Libertas Pallacanestro players
Power forwards (basketball)
Medalists at the 1995 Summer Universiade